Surkhi Assembly constituency is one of the 230 Vidhan Sabha (Legislative Assembly) constituencies of Madhya Pradesh state in central India. This constituency came into existence in 1951, as one of the Vidhan Sabha constituencies of Madhya Pradesh state.

Overview
Surkhi (constituency number 37) is one of the 8 Vidhan Sabha constituencies located in Sagar district. This constituency presently covers the entire Rahatgarh tehsil and part of Sagar tehsil of the district.

Surkhi is part of Sagar Lok Sabha constituency along with seven other Vidhan Sabha segments, namely, Bina,  Khurai, Naryoli and Sagar in this district and Kurwai, Sironj and Shamshabad in Vidisha district.

Members of Legislative Assembly

Election results

2018 results 

In 2020 by-election, Govind Singh Rajpoot of Bharatiya Janata Party won the seat by defeating Parul Sahu Keshri from Indian National Congress with a margin of 40,991 votes. Rajput secured 93,294 votes while runner-up Parul got only 52,303 votes. Thus Rajput won by margin of 40,991 votes.

See also
 Rahatgarh

References

Sagar district
Assembly constituencies of Madhya Pradesh